Jozef 'Jos' Daerden (born 26 November 1954) is a Belgian football manager and a former player. He works as an assistant manager of K.R.C. Genk.

Club career 
Daerden formerly played with K.S.K. Tongeren, Standard de Liège, Roda JC, K. Beerschot V.A.C. and Germinal Ekeren.

International career 
Daerden played 5 times with the Belgium national team between 1982 and 1984.

Coaching career 
He coached K.S.K. Beveren, Lommel S.K., Standard de Liège, Lierse S.K., K.R.C. Genk, R.A.E.C. Mons, Germinal Beerschot and FC Metalurh Donetsk. On 3 September 2009 Germinal Beerschot have hired Daerden to replace Aimé Anthuenis until the end of the season. In June 2010 Daerden moved to Dutch champion FC Twente to become the assistant coach to Michel Preud'homme. On 28 June 2011, he signed a one-year deal to become the head coach of newly relegated club S. du Pays de Charleroi

Personal life 
His son is former footballer Koen Daerden.

Honours

Player 
Standard Liège

 Belgian First Division: 1981–82, 1982–83
 Belgian Cup: 1980–81 (winners), 1983-84 (runners-up)
 Belgian Super Cup: 1981, 1983
 European Cup Winners' Cup: 1981-82 (runners-up)
 Intertoto Cup Group Winners: 1980, 1982

Manager

Lierse SK 

 Belgian Super Cup: 1997

References

External links

1954 births
Living people
Association football midfielders
Belgian footballers
Belgium international footballers
Standard Liège players
Roda JC Kerkrade players
K. Beerschot V.A.C. players
Beerschot A.C. players
Belgian Pro League players
Belgian football managers
Belgian expatriate football managers
K.S.K. Beveren managers
Standard Liège managers
Lierse S.K. managers
FC Metalurh Donetsk managers
Újpest FC managers
Ukrainian Premier League managers
Beerschot A.C. managers
FC Eindhoven managers
1982 FIFA World Cup players
Expatriate football managers in Ukraine
Belgian expatriate sportspeople in Ukraine
Expatriate football managers in the Netherlands
Expatriate football managers in Hungary
Expatriate football managers in Russia
K.R.C. Genk non-playing staff
FC Twente non-playing staff
Nemzeti Bajnokság I managers
People from Tongeren
Footballers from Limburg (Belgium)